Otto Gleichmann (20 August 1887, in Mainz – 2 November 1963, in Hannover) was a key figure in German expressionism. He produced oil paintings, watercolor paintings, sketches, lithographs and pictures in mixed media.

His works from the 1920s and 1930s were characterised by his bad experiences as a soldier (1915) and his injuries (1916) during the First World War - and his belief that the growth of National Socialism was a bad thing.

He took part in the Hannoversche Sezession from 1918, where he met Kurt Schwitters, among others, and became friends with Theodor Däubler. His exhibition was banned, and he was named a degenerate artist in 1938.

Work and exhibitions
Selbstbildnis (self-portrait) 1913, Pencil on paper
Sturm Herrschaften 1915, Pencil on paper
Irrenparadies II, 1918, Pencil on paper
Strahlen - Stuerzen (Lines/Rays) Oil on canvas, 1920
Vor dunkler Landschaft (Against the darker landscape) Oil on canvas, 1920
Unfassbar, unfasslich sind ihm die Dinge (inconceivable are things for him), Pen and watercolour on paper, 1920
Kopf einer Greisin Mixed media, 1927
Leichenschmaus, 1925

See also
 List of German painters

20th-century German painters
20th-century German male artists
German male painters
Artists from Mainz
1887 births
1963 deaths
German Expressionist painters
People from Rhenish Hesse